Vladimir Viktorovich Kiselyov (sometimes listed as Volodymyr Kyselyov 1 January 1957 – 7 January 2021) was a Soviet-born Ukrainian athlete who mainly competed in the shot put during his career.

He competed for the USSR in the 1980 Summer Olympics held in Moscow, Soviet Union where he won the gold medal in the men's shot put event.

In 1985, Kiselyov lost 25 kg (55 lbs) and almost died as a result of past use of prohibited substances, specifically testosterone.

References
Biography
Wallenschinsky, David and Jaime Loucky (2008). "Track & Field (Men): Shot Put". In The Complete Book of the Olympics: 2008 Edition. London: Aurum Press. p. 238.

External links

1957 births
2021 deaths
People from Myski
Ukrainian male shot putters
Ukrainian athletics coaches
Soviet male shot putters
Olympic gold medalists for the Soviet Union
Athletes (track and field) at the 1980 Summer Olympics
Olympic athletes of the Soviet Union
Medalists at the 1980 Summer Olympics
Olympic gold medalists in athletics (track and field)
Friendship Games medalists in athletics